Mitchinson may refer to:

John Mitchinson (bishop), DD (1833–1918), English teacher, Anglican priest, Bishop of Barbados, Master of Pembroke College, Oxford
John Mitchinson (researcher), the head of research for the British television panel game QI
John Mitchinson (tenor) (born 1932), English operatic tenor
Martin Mitchinson author of The Darien Gap, a non-fiction book, published 2008
Sam Mitchinson (born 1992), left footed Australian football (soccer) player
Scott Mitchinson (born 1984), Australian minor league baseball player
Steven Mitchinson, (born 1975), lawn bowler from Harlow, Essex
Wendy Mitchinson (1947–2021), Canadian historian at the University of Waterloo, Canada Research Chair in Gender and Medical history

See also
William Mitchinson Hicks, FRS (1850–1934), British mathematician and physicist
Cyril Edwin Mitchinson Joad or C. E. M. Joad (1891–1953), English philosopher and broadcasting personality